The Diocese of Bazas, centred on Bazas in Aquitaine, covered the Bazadais region, known under the Romans as the Vasatensis pagus after the ancient occupants, the Vasates. In the 2nd century it was part of the Novempopulania, one of the seventeen provinces of Gaul. The diocese must have been created between the first and the third centuries, but because of the large numbers of invaders that passed through this region - Arians, Saracens, Normans - the list of bishops is much reduced during the first millennium. The first bishop of this diocese is mentioned, without a name, by Gregory of Tours in his De gloria martyrum.

The diocese of Bazas, the seat of which was the cathedral of Saint-Jean-Baptiste de Bazas,  was bordered on the north by the diocese of Périgueux, on the east by the diocese of Agen and the diocese of Condom, on the south by the diocese of Aire and the diocese of Dax, and on the west by the archdiocese of Bordeaux. It was divided into three archdeaconries.

It was suppressed during the French Revolution by the Legislative Assembly, under the Civil Constitution of the Clergy (1790).  By the Concordat of 1801 its territory was unequally divided between the dioceses of Aire, Agen and Bordeaux. The title of the diocese of Bazas was preserved and assigned to the Archdiocese of Bordeaux-Bazas.

Bishops of Bazas

to 1300
 after 406: bishop, name unknown, mentioned by Gregory of Tours
 506 and 511: Sextilius
 585: Orestes
 614: Gudualdus
 673-675: Gundulfus
...
 977-980: Gombaud, bishop of Gascony
 c. 980-1000: Arsius Raca (Administrator during the minority of Hugo)
 1000- c. 1012: Hugues
 c. 1012- c. 1025 or 1029: Arsius Raca
 c. 1025- c. 1059: Raimond 'Vetulus' (the Elder)
 1059-1084: Raimond the Younger
 1084 - c. 1103: Étienne de Sentes
 1104-1126: Bertrand de Baslade
 1126 - c. 1134: Geoffroy or Godefroy
 1134-1143 or 1144: Fortis Guarini de Pellegrue
 1144-1146: Raimond
 1146- c. 1165: Guillaume Arnaud de Tontoulon
 c. 1165-1186: Garsias de Benquet
 1186-1213 or 1214: Gaillard de la Mothe
 1214-1219: Guillaume II
 1219-1242: Arnaud I de Pins
 1242-1265: Raimond IV de Castillon
 1265-1277: Guillaume III de Pins
 1277-1294 or 1296: Hugues II de Rochefort
 1294 ou 1296-1299: Guillaume IV Geoffroy
 1299-1302: Arnaud Falquet, Fouquet, Foucaud or Foulques

since 1300
 1302-1313 and 1319: Guillaume V Arnaud de La Mothe
 1313-1318: Theobald de Castillon (Thibault)
 1318-1319: Guillaume de La Mothe (again)
 1319–1325 Guillaume
 1325-1334: Pictavin (Poitevin) de Montesquiou
 1334-1348: Gaillard de Fargues or de la Trave or de Préchac
 1348-1357: Raimond Arnaud de la Mothe
 1358-1360: Géraud or Gérald du Puy or du Puch (de Podio)
 1360: Pierre
 1361-1368: Guillaume VII
 1371-1374: Guillaume IX de Montlaur

Great Western Schism
 Allegiance to Avignon
 1374-1394: Jean I de Caseton, O.Min.
 1395-1397: Guillaume X d'Ortholan
 1397-1417: Pierre II Saupin
 Allegiance to Rome
 1393: Maurice Usk, O.P.
 1396 - c. 1411 or 1412: Jean de Heremo, O.E.S.A.

Return to unity
 1421- c. 1430: Bernard d'Yvon
 1433-1446: Henri François de Cavier
 1447-1450: Bernard Yvest de Roserge
 1450-1457: Raimond de Tulle
 1457-1485: Raimond  du Treuil, O.Min.
 1486-1504: Jean de Bonald
 1504-1520: Cardinal Amanieu d'Albret (Administrator)
 1521-1528: Symphorien Bullioud
 1528-1531: Foucauld de Bonnevald
 1531-1544: Jean IV de Plats or Plas
 1544-1554: Annet de Plas
 1555-1558 or 1561: Jean Baptiste Alamanni
 1558-1559: Amanieu de Foix, died before taking possession of his bishopric.
 1563-1564: Jean de Balaguier
 1564-1572: François de Balaguier
 1572-1605: Arnaud de Pontac
 1605-1631: Jean Jaubert de Barrault de Blaignac
 1631-1633: Nicolas de Grillié, Grillet or Grilles
 1633-1645: Henri II Listolfi Maroni
 1646-1667: Samuel Martineau de Turé
 1668-1684: Guillaume de Boissonade d'Orty
 1685-1724: Jacques-Joseph de Gourgue
 1724-1746: Edme Mongin, occupied Seat 26 of the Académie française (1707-1746)
 1746-1792: Jean Baptiste II Amédée de Grégoire de Saint-Sauveur

See also
 Catholic Church in France
 List of Catholic dioceses in France

References

Bibliography

Reference works
  (Use with caution; obsolete)
  (in Latin) 
 (in Latin)

Studies

Dupuy, Jérôme-Géraud (1747), Chronique de Bazas, in: Archives historiques du département de la Gironde Tome 15 (1874), pp. 1–67.

Bazas
History of Aquitaine
1801 disestablishments in France